Frank Thomas Winters (born October 15, 1939) is an American former competition swimmer who represented the United States at the 1960 Summer Olympics in Rome.  He swam for the gold medal-winning U.S. team in the preliminary heats of the men's 4×200-meter freestyle relay.  However, Winters did not receive a medal because only relay swimmers who competed in the event final were eligible under the 1960 Olympic rules.

References

1939 births
Living people
American male freestyle swimmers
Olympic swimmers of the United States
Sportspeople from Suffolk County, New York
Swimmers at the 1960 Summer Olympics